Clinton Harold Steindl (born 15 March 1989) is an Australian professional basketball player for the Tasmania JackJumpers of the National Basketball League (NBL). After attending the Australian Institute of Sport, he moved to the United States in 2008 to play college basketball for Saint Mary's. In 2012, he returned to Australia and joined the Cairns Taipans, where he spent two seasons. In 2014, he joined the Townsville Crocodiles, where he spent another two seasons and won the NBL Most Improved Player in 2016. After stints in Belgium and Greece, he joined the Perth Wildcats in 2017, going on to win two NBL championships in 2019 and 2020. He has also represented the Australian national team.

Early life and career
Steindl grew up in Mackay, Queensland, and attended secondary school in Brisbane at Anglican Church Grammar School. In 2007 and 2008, he attended the Australian Institute of Sport (AIS) in Canberra, where he played for the program's SEABL team.

For the 2008–09 season, Steindl moved to the United States to play college basketball for Saint Mary's. In 122 games over four seasons, he made 70 starts and averaged 6.2 points and 2.4 rebounds in 20.6 minutes per game.

As a senior in 2011–12, Steindl began the season in the starting lineup, but had to miss three games in the middle of the season after injuring his ankle against Missouri State. When he returned, his starting spot had been claimed. Left to come off the bench, Steindl operated as a 3-point specialist and defensive stopper. A mid-February injury to starting guard Stephen Holt saw him miss the remainder of the regular season, leading to Steindl moving back into the starting lineup. In the five games during Holt's absence, Steindl averaged 12.2 points per game. In three of those five games, he led the Gaels in scoring. His roommates as a senior were fellow Australians Matthew Dellavedova and Mitchell Young.

College statistics

|-
| style="text-align:left;"| 2008–09
| style="text-align:left;"| Saint Mary's
| 24 || 0 || 9.0 || .333 || .333 || .800 || 1.0 || .2 || .0 || .0 || 2.7
|-
| style="text-align:left;"| 2009–10
| style="text-align:left;"| Saint Mary's
| 34 || 26 || 23.8 || .415 || .377 || .813 || 2.6 || 1.1 || .6 || .1 || 6.9
|-
| style="text-align:left;"| 2010–11
| style="text-align:left;"| Saint Mary's
| 34 || 30 || 23.0 || .427 || .423 || .615 || 2.7 || 1.0 || .4 || .2 || 6.6
|-
| style="text-align:left;"| 2011–12
| style="text-align:left;"| Saint Mary's
| 30 || 14 || 23.5 || .408 || .420 || .938 || 2.9 || .9 || .6 || .2 || 7.9
|-
| style="text-align:center;" colspan="2"|Career
| 122 || 70 || 20.6 || .408 || .400 || .828 || 2.4 || .8 || .4 || .2 || 6.2
|-

Professional career
Upon completing his college career, Steindl returned home to Queensland and joined the Cairns Taipans of the National Basketball League. Over two seasons with the Taipans, he played 53 games and averaged 4.1 points as a rookie and 7.4 points during the 2013–14 season.

In 2014, Steindl played in the Queensland Basketball League with the Mackay Meteors. After initially indicating his desire to play in Europe, Steindl joined the Townsville Crocodiles ahead of the 2014–15 NBL season. After averaging 9.6 points in 28 games during his first season with the Crocodiles, Steindl had a four-game stint with the Meteors in 2015.

Steindl returned to the Crocodiles for the 2015–16 season and won the NBL Most Improved Player Award. In 28 games, he averaged 12.7 points per game.

For the 2016–17 season, Steindl moved to Belgium to play for the Leuven Bears, where he averaged 12.8 points in 26 games.

Following a pre-season stint with the Perth Wildcats, Steindl returned to the Europe for the 2017–18 season, joining Greek team Panionios. However, he appeared in just three games for Panionios before returning to Australia. He reunited with the Wildcats and averaged 2.8 points in 23 games.

An off-season stint with the SBL's Cockburn Cougars in 2018 saw him suffer a fractured left wrist in just his second game. He returned to Perth for the 2018–19 season and won his first NBL championship after the Wildcats defeated Melbourne United 3–1 in the 2019 NBL Grand Final series. In 34 games in 2018–19, he averaged 6.9 points per game. During the 2019 off-season, he played for the Perry Lakes Hawks in the SBL.

On 6 April 2019, Steindl re-signed with the Wildcats on a two-year deal. In March 2020, he was crowned an NBL champion for the second year in a row.

In January 2021, Steindl played his 200th NBL game. On 19 May 2021, he scored a career high-tying 25 points with six 3-pointers in a 91–88 loss to the Brisbane Bullets. He helped the Wildcats reach the 2021 NBL Grand Final series, but was hampered by a groin injury during the series, as the Wildcats lost 3–0 to Melbourne United. He parted ways with the Wildcats following the season.

On 5 July 2021, Steindl signed a two-year deal with the Tasmania JackJumpers, a new franchise entering the NBL for the first time in 2021–22. He was named the JackJumpers' inaugural captain.

After missing the first six weeks of the 2022–23 NBL season due to stress fractures in his shins, Steindl signed a two-year contract extension with the JackJumpers on 16 November 2022.

National team career
Steindl was selected to compete on the Australian under-19 squad that toured France in 2007. In 2011, he made his debut for the senior national team, the Australian Boomers. In 2013, he won gold at the Stanković Cup and silver at the World University Games.

In June 2022, Steindl was named in the Boomers' World Cup Qualifiers team.

Personal
Steindl's wife is former Perth Lynx player Kayla Standish.

References

External links

NBL player profile
Townsville Crocodiles player profile
Saint Mary's bio
"Steindl Knows He Needs to Deliver for Wildcats" at nbl.com.au
"Perth Wildcats star Clint Steindl reveals challenges of financial sacrifices made by NBL players this season" at thewest.com.au

1989 births
Living people
Australian expatriate basketball people in the United States
Australian men's basketball players
Australian Institute of Sport basketball players
Cairns Taipans players
Leuven Bears players
Medalists at the 2013 Summer Universiade
Panionios B.C. players
Perth Wildcats players
Saint Mary's Gaels men's basketball players
Shooting guards
Small forwards
Sportsmen from Queensland
Sportspeople from Mackay, Queensland
Tasmania JackJumpers players
Townsville Crocodiles players
Universiade medalists in basketball
Universiade silver medalists for Australia